Events from the year 1748 in art.

Events
 The Paris Salon first introduces a jury.
 Patience Lovell, the first recognized American-born sculptor, marries Joseph Wright.

Works

 Canaletto – The South Façade of Warwick Castle (Thyssen-Bornemisza Museum, Madrid)
 Maurice Quentin de La Tour – Marie Leszczyńska, Queen of France and Nazarre (pastels)
 Robert Feke – Portrait of William Bowdoin
 Thomas Gainsborough – Landscape in Suffolk
 William Hogarth – The Gate of Calais, or O, the Roast Beef of Old England

Awards
 Prix de Rome (for sculpture) – Augustin Pajou

Births
 May 22 – Thomas Roberts, Irish Landscape artist (died 1778)
 June 22 – John Carter, English draughtsman and architect (died 1817)
 August 30, Jacques-Louis David, French painter (died 1825)
 September 26 – Johann Sebastian Bach, German painter and grandson of the composer (died 1778)
 October 9 – Jacob Adam, Austrian copper etcher (died 1811)
 October 16 – Augustin Dupré, French engraver of French currency and medals (died 1833)
 October 13 – Johann Dominicus Fiorillo, painter and art historian (died 1821)
 date unknown
 Antonio Carnicero, Spanish painter in the Neoclassical style (died 1814)
 Christina Chalon, Dutch painter and etcher (died 1808)
 Marie-Anne Collot, French sculptor (died 1821)
 Charles Eschard, French painter, draftsman and engraver (died 1810)
 Pierre-Charles Jombert, French painter (died 1825)
 Louis Masreliez, Swedish painter and interior designer (died 1810)
 John Ramage, Irish American goldsmith and miniaturist (died 1802)
 Dionys van Dongen, Dutch painter (died 1819)
 Marten Waefelaerts, Flemish 18th century landscape painter (died 1799)
 1748/1749: Henry Pelham, American painter, engraver, and cartographer (died 1806) (drowned)

Deaths
 April 12 – William Kent, architect and designer (born 1685)
 May 5 – Alessandro Galli Bibiena, Italian architect and painter, eldest son of Ferdinando Galli Bibiena (born 1686)
 June 11 – Felice Torelli, Italian from a family of painters, painter of altarpieces (born 1667)
 August 14 – Thomas Germain, silversmith (born 1673)
 September 15 – Johann Georg Schmidt, Austrian Baroque painter (born 1685)
 date unknown
 Ferdinando del Cairo, Italian painter of the Baroque (born 1666)
 Giovanni Casini, Italian portrait painter and sculptor (born 1689)
 Giovanni Battista Lama, Italian painter, active mainly in Naples (born 1673)
 Giovanni Pietro Ligario, Italian painter of historical pictures for churches and private collections (born 1686)
 Henry Scheemakers, Flemish sculptor (born unknown)
 Robert van Audenaerde, Flemish painter and engraver (born 1663)

 
Years of the 18th century in art
1740s in art